The 1972 ARFU Asian Rugby Championship was the 3rd edition of the tournament, and it was played in Hong Kong. Taiwan was supposed to participate, but the government of Hong Kong refused the entrance of the Taiwan national team for the friendly relation with the People's Republic of China. The seven teams were divided into two pools, with the final between the winner of each pool. Japan won the tournament.

Tournament

Pool A 

 Results
 Nov 4
 Nov 6
 Nov 8

Pool B 

 Results
 Nov 5
 Nov 7
 Nov 9

Finals

Fifth Place Final

Third Place Final

First Place Final

 Results
 5th place
 3rd place
 Final

Final standings

References

External links
 Rugby Football 22巻 (in Japanese)
The above link contains detailed game results for Japan.
 The scoring system has changed from this edition.
T is for try worth 4 points, G is for goal worth 6 points (including try), PG is for penalty goal worth 3 points, and DG is for dropped goal worth 3 points.
 For the scoring detail, refer to History of rugby union

 ESPN UK
 Malaysia results

1972
1972 rugby union tournaments for national teams
1972–73 in Japanese rugby union
International rugby union competitions hosted by Hong Kong
1972 in Hong Kong sport
1972 in rugby union